Klikia is a genus of fossil air-breathing land snails, a terrestrial pulmonate gastropod molluscs in the family Elonidae.

This genus is named after Bohumil Klika (1868-1942, also known as Gottlieb Klika), the author of the 1891 book Die tertiaeren Land- und Süsswasser-Conchylien des nord-westlichen Böhmen.

Original description 
The genus Klikia was originally described by Henry Augustus Pilsbry in 1895.

Pilsbry's original text (the type description) reads as follows:

References
This article incorporates public domain text from reference.

External links 
  Fischer K. & Wenz W. A. 1914 Die Landschneckenkalke des Mainzer Beckens und ihre Fauna. page 70-71.

Elonidae
Prehistoric gastropod genera